State Route 174 (SR 174) is a state highway in the U.S. state of California. The two-lane 13-mile (21 km) highway in the western Sierra Nevada, added to the state highway system in 1933, connects Interstate 80 in Colfax with SR 20/SR 49 in Grass Valley, crossing the Bear River next to a 1924 concrete arch bridge. The majority of the route is eligible for the State Scenic Highway System, but local residents have blocked its designation due to property right concerns.

Route description
State Route 174 begins at exit 135 of I-80 in Colfax. Immediately after crossing I-80, the route turns right on Auburn Street and right again on Central Street, which bypasses downtown; a business route follows Auburn Street, Grass Valley Street, and Main Street through downtown. SR 174 follows the old Lincoln Highway (US 40) north out of downtown to Rollins Lake Road, where the present state highway turns northwest along the Colfax Highway. It then crosses the Bear River from Placer County into Nevada County on a 1987 bridge, with the old 1924 bridge preserved for non-motorized traffic. The land flattens out as SR 174 curves north and west through the Empire Mine State Historic Park into Grass Valley. Turning west on Colfax Avenue, the state highway passes under the SR 20/SR 49 freeway before ending just beyond at Auburn Street, the former surface routing of SR 49.

SR 174 is not part of the National Highway System, a network of highways that are considered essential to the country's economy, defense, and mobility by the Federal Highway Administration. SR 174 is eligible to be included in the State Scenic Highway System, but it is not officially designated as a scenic highway by the California Department of Transportation.

History
The Capital Construction Company began improving the county road between Colfax (on Route 37, signed as US 40) and Grass Valley (on Route 17) under contract on September 29, 1931, and completed the work by mid-September 1932. The state legislature placed it on the state highway system in 1933 as an extension of the existing Nevada City-Downieville Route 25. In the 1964 renumbering, the highway received a signed designation, State Route 174.

Local residents created the Colfax Highway Association in 1967 at the Peardale firehouse, about halfway between the two ends, in order to preserve the rural nature of the road. When the 21-foot (6.5 m) wide 1924 concrete arch bridge that took SR 174 across the Bear River on the county line was set for replacement in the late 1980s, the group successfully lobbied to preserve it for non-motorized traffic. The association also pushed for Nevada County's Gold Country Stage bus service to add a route along the highway to Colfax, which was agreed to in late 1998 and still runs as Route 12, connecting downtown Grass Valley with Colfax's Amtrak station. After a request by Nevada County in 1988, the state legislature designated the part of SR 174 in unincorporated Nevada County (between the county line and the Grass Valley city limits) as eligible for the State Scenic Highway System in 1991. In 1999, the Colfax Highway Association attempted to get the route officially declared a State Scenic Highway.  They argued that the designation would "protect the scenic character and rural flavor of the highway".  A newly formed group, Concerned Citizens for 174, opposed the designation because it would restrict the property rights of residents along the highway, for instance requiring them to use "natural colors". The opposition was successful, and SR 174 remains eligible for State Scenic Highway status but is not a State Scenic Highway.

Major intersections

See also

References

External links

California Highway Conditions: SR 174
California Highways: SR 174
California @ AARoads.com - State Route 174

174
State Route 174
State Route 174
Grass Valley, California